Silver/Lead is the sixteenth studio album by British post-punk band Wire. It was released on 31 March 2017.

Background
Silver/Lead was conceived to arrive in conjunction with the fortieth anniversary of Wire's first gig as a four-piece band on 1 April 1977 at The Roxy in London (there had been three previous gigs with a fifth member, George Gill, earlier that year). In recalling the occasion, singer-guitarist Colin Newman remarked, "It struck me in 2013 that the first of April, 2017, was going to be the 40th anniversary of the first proper Wire gig. And I thought, 'Well, should we do something about it or should we not?' But – and this partly comes from fine art, partly from pop culture – there's this idea of a narrative. People like a story. They like to connect the dots somehow." The album was recorded both at Newman's own home studio and at Rockfield Studios in Monmouth, a studio Newman claims is well-suited for Wire because "there is not much else to do there."

Wire announced the impending release of Silver/Lead on their website on 17 January 2017, describing the music on the album as "a uniquely addictive 21st century psychedelic post-punk" that was "about as far from nostalgia as you could get." The album was released in four different form factors: a standard CD, a digital download, a vinyl version, and a special limited-edition CD/hard-backed book box featuring text by Graham Duff, interviews, and exclusive color photographs.

The band released two streaming singles off of the album prior to the full release. The first single, "Short Elevated Period", was released on 23 January 2017 on NPR Music. Bob Boilen, writing for NPR, describes the track as "music that looks at the present and forward to the future, still with its artful guitar driven snap, all the more surprising for a band that didn't look like it would make it past the three-year mark." The second single, “Diamonds In Cups”, was released for streaming on Stereogum on 28 February 2017. Stereogum’s Kim Ilkowski wrote that the song "[features] some exceptional guitar work that takes you up and down on a blissful, bouncing ride."

Track listing

Personnel
Wire
Colin Newman – lead vocals , electric guitar, keyboards, acoustic guitar , 12-string guitar , mandola , M-Tron baritone , fx , production, mixing
Graham Lewis – bass guitar, lead vocals , backing vocals , Casio SK-1 , loops and samples , cover image
Robert Grey – drums
Matthew Simms – electric guitar , lap steel , mandola , modular synth , Korg MS-10 , fx , autoharp 
Production
Tim Lewis – engineering 
Jeroen Melchers – engineering
Denis Blackham – mastering
Jon Wozencroft – art direction

Charts

See also
List of 2017 albums

References

External links

Wire (band) albums
2017 albums
Albums recorded at Rockfield Studios